Petrus Johannes Truter (17 December 1747, in Cape Town – 31 January 1825, in Swellendam, Overberg) was an explorer and official in the (Dutch?) East India Company, a Member of the Court of Justice, and a Commissioner of Police.

P.J. Truter was one of 14 children born to Jan Andries Truter and Maria Kuypermann. He married Johanna Ernestina Blankenberg on 18 April 1773, who bore him 7 children including Anna Maria Truter, who later became the wife of Sir John Barrow, 1st Baronet.

In 1801 P.J. Truter helped lead the Truter-Somerville Expedition along with William Somerville. The expedition included John Barrow (who would later marry one of his daughters), Samuel Daniell, and missionaries Jan Matthys Kok and William Edwards.

References

1747 births
1825 deaths
People from Cape Town